Bolesław Ignacy Florian Wieniawa-Długoszowski (22 July 1881 – 1 July 1942) was a Polish general, adjutant to Chief of State Józef Piłsudski, politician, freemason, diplomat, poet, artist and formally for one day the President of the Republic of Poland.

He was one of the generation that fought for and saw the rebirth of an independent Poland on 11 November 1918 (National Independence Day), only to see that independence lost again after the 1939 division of Poland between Nazi Germany and the Soviet Union pursuant to the Molotov–Ribbentrop Pact.

Before World War I 
Bolesław Wieniawa-Długoszowski was born 22 July 1881 on his family's estate in Maksymówka near Stanisławów in Galicia, then part of the Austro-Hungarian Empire, (now Ivano-Frankivsk in the Ukraine), the son of Bolesław Długoszowski (a railway engineer, who built the railway from Tarnów to Krynica-Zdrój via Bobowa) and Józefina, née Struszkiewicz. He had an elder brother Kazimierz and two sisters; Teofila (Michalewska) the grandmother of Inka Bokiewicz, the girl who first adopted Wojtek the bear and Zofia (Kubicka).

In 1877, his family bought the manor house in Bobowa. Bobowa, (Bobov in Yiddish), was a centre of Hassidic life in Poland. There were good relations between the Jews of Bobowa and the Długoszowski family (Kazimierz, the elder brother, appears with Grand Rabbi Ben Zion Halberstam on the cover of the book "Jewish Society in Poland"). There Bolesław spent his early life. He attended secondary school in Lwów, then he moved to a school in Nowy Sącz, graduating in 1900.  Subsequently, he studied medicine at Jan Kazimierz University (currently Lviv University) in Lwów, graduating with high distinction in 1906. In 1906 he married his first wife, the singer Stephania Calvas.

After his studies, he moved to Berlin, where he spent a year studying at the Berlin Academy of Fine Arts. After completing his degree there in 1907, he moved to Paris, where he worked as a private physician.

Between 1907 and 1914, he lived in Montparnasse sharing to the full in the bohemian life of Paris, mixing with the Polish artist living there, many of whom were members of the Young Poland movement. In 1911 he was a founder, with the sculptor  of the Association of Polish Artists (Towarzystwo Artystów Polskich). The next year this group joined the main Riflemen's Association (Związek Strzelecki "Strzelec"), where he met Józef Piłsudski in December 1913.

1914–42 

In 1914, he moved to Kraków and joined the First Cadre Company, which fought on the Austro-Hungarian side against Russia. During the fighting in 1914–1915, he was promoted to lieutenant, and after the war he was awarded the V-Class Virtuti Militari. In August 1915, he moved to the special group in Warsaw. Soon he became an aide-de-camp to Józef Piłsudski. In 1918, he was sent on a mission to Russia. He was given three tasks: persuade General Józef Haller's army, then in the Ukraine, to back Piłsudski (he failed in this task); reach the French military mission in Moscow under General Lavergne (he succeeded in this task); and return from Moscow to Paris to liaise with the government there. Unfortunately, he was arrested by the Soviet Cheka as a member of the Polish Military Organisation while on a French diplomatic train on its way from Moscow to Murmansk (and Paris). He was imprisoned in the Taganka prison. He was freed thanks to the intervention of his future wife, Bronisława Wieniawa-Długoszowska, with the much-feared Cheka operative Yakovleva, then in charge of the prison. Bronisława, née Kliatchkin, was at that time married to the lawyer , the lawyer of Felix Dzerzhinsky, the head of the Cheka. She was a Lutheran, her family having converted from the Jewish faith when she was eight. He married her in a Lutheran ceremony on 2 October 1919 at Lutheran zbór in Nowy Gawłów. The marriage register records the details from her false French passport, including "Lalande" as her maiden name.

As aide-de-camp of Józef Piłsudski during the Polish-Soviet War he helped him organize the Vilna Operation and Battle of Warsaw. He was also a commander of 1st Cavalry Division. After the war, Wieniawa was awarded many medals (including the Légion d'honneur, Cross of Valor and Cross of Independence).

Throughout the interwar years, he was a key figure in Warsaw literary and social life. He had a table reserved for him with leading Warsaw literary figures, such as Julian Tuwim and Jan Lechoń, at the mezzanine of the café . In a famous anecdote, Aleksander Wat recounts how, when Wat was imprisoned, by the government of the Second Polish Republic for his literary activities (he was the publisher of the crypto-communist magazine ), he received, in prison, a hamper of vodka and caviar from Wieniawa. The purpose of that story, in Wat's memoirs "My century", is to contrast his treatment at the hands of the Second Polish Republic with the vicious and barbaric treatment he was to receive in Soviet prisons during the war.

In November 1921, Wieniawa became the Polish military attaché in Bucharest, Romania. He was associated with making the Polish-Romanian convention which was signed in 1922. In 1926 he passed his exams in High War School.

During the May Coup of 1926, he was one of Piłsudski's officers who helped him to organise the coup.

In 1930–32, he was commander of I Cavalry Division and, for some time, of II Cavalry Division. In 1938 he was promoted to Major-General, . From 1938 to 13 June 1940, he was the Polish Ambassador in Rome.

One-day presidency 
On 17 September 1939, he was nominated president of Poland by the retiring President Ignacy Mościcki. On the same day, Poland was invaded by the Soviet Union, and he took the train from Rome to Paris to take on his new role. His appointment was published in the Official Journal, Monitor Polski, on 25 September 1939. His appointment was blackballed by the French Third Republic and also opposed by Władysław Sikorski. After the capitulation of France, he emigrated to New York City by travelling via Lisbon.

Many sources do not list Wieniawa as president but merely as "designated successor". However, according to the then constitution, when the President cannot execute his powers (as when Mościcki was interned in Romania and it was clear that he would not be released unless he resigned), the designated successor automatically became president.

After receiving appointment or becoming president, Wieniawa-Długoszowski asked Cardinal August Hlond to become Prime Minister. Hlond refused and referred to Wieniawa as "Mr. President".

Also, in a press statement from President Lech Wałęsa's press secretary on 21 September 1994 to Dziennik Polski, Wieniawa-Długoszowski was referred to as one of the legitimate presidents-in-exile.

According to some opinions, Mościcki had meant to pass his office to Wieniawa-Długoszowski as caretaker until the office could be assumed by a candidate acceptable to both Sanacja and opposition circles, General Kazimierz Sosnkowski, whose whereabouts were unknown in September 1939. Finally, after Wieniawa's resignation, a compromise candidate, Władysław Raczkiewicz, was chosen.

Death 
Once in the United States, Wieniawa-Długoszowski settled in New York City. Unable to get any position in the Polish Army from Władysław Sikorski since he was part of the Piłsudskiist Sanation Movement, which had ruled Poland from 1926 to 1939, which Sikorski had opposed (Sikorski organised a coup against Wieniawa in 1939). He moved to Detroit, where he was appointed editor-in-chief of Frank Januszewski's Dziennik Polski (Detroit). Finally, on 18 April 1942, Sikorski appointed Wieniawa minister plenipotentiary to the governments of Cuba, Dominican Republic, and  Haiti, based in Havana. On 20 June 1942 the National Committee of Americans of Polish Extraction (KNAPP) was founded in New York, with Wieniawa listed as a founder. KNAPP was strongly for retaining Poland's eastern territories, was critical of Sikorsk, and was entirely distrustful of Stalin. Wieniawa, after moving back to New York, caught between these two opposing forces, committed suicide on 1 July 1942. Some sources say he committed suicide by leaping from an upper story of his New York city residence (3 Riverside Drive), but the exact details of his death are debated among historians. He left a suicide note. One month later, on 14 August 1942, the Jewish ghetto in his home village of Bobowa was liquidated; about 700 inhabitants were killed in a mass execution in the Garbacz Forest.

Wieniawa's remains were brought back to Kraków for reburial in the Rakowicki Cemetery, on 27 September 1990, where he now lies with his fallen comrades from the World War I Polish Legions.

Honours and awards

Polish
 Order of the White Eagle
 Order of St. Stanislaus
 Knight's Cross of the Virtuti Militari, Virtuti Militari class V Silver (November 1921)
 Cross of Valour, four times
 Cross of Independence with Swords (May 1931)
 Commander's Cross of the Order of Polonia Restituta (March 1934), Commander's Cross with star (November 1938) (previously awarded the Officer's Cross)
 Gold Cross of Merit
 Decades of Independence Medal Regained
 Golden Laurel of the Polish Academy of Literature Academic merit for literature, (November 1936).

Foreign
 Imperial Order of Leopold (Austria)
 Military Order of Max Joseph (Bavaria)
 Officer (1921) then Commander (1937) of the Legion of Honour (France)
 Military Order of Maria Theresa (Austro-Hungarian Empire)
 Order of Saints Cyril and Methodius (Bulgaria)
 Croix de guerre 1914–1918 (France)
 Knight of the Equestrian Order of the Holy Sepulchre of Jerusalem (Holy See)
 Grand Officer of the Order of Saints Maurice and Lazarus (Italy) (December 1937)
 Commander of the Order of the Star of Romania (October 1922)
 Commander of the Military Merit Cross (Austria-Hungary)
 Commander of the Order of the White Eagle (Yugoslavia)
 Commander of the Order of the Three Stars (Latvia), (November 1927)
 10th Anniversary Commemorative Medal Fight for Liberation of the Republic of Latvia (July 1928)
 Grand Commander of the Order of Merit (Hungary), Cross of Merit 2nd class with star (January 1929)

References

Bibliography
By Wieniawa

 
 
 
 
 
 
 
 
 
 
 
Wieniawa's songs
 
 
 
 
About Wieniawa
 
 
 
 
 
 
 
 
 
Books about his period in France 1907-1914
 
 
 
 
Books about the period as ambassador in Rome and the "President for a day" episode
 
 
 
 
 
 
 
Books about his period in America
 
 
Books mainly of photographs
 
 
Films Wieniawa helped to make
 
 
Films about Wieniawa
 
 
 
 

1881 births
1942 deaths
People from Ivano-Frankivsk Oblast
People from the Kingdom of Galicia and Lodomeria
Clan of Wieniawa
Polish Austro-Hungarians
Sanacja politicians
Presidents of Poland
Diplomats of the Second Polish Republic
Ambassadors of Poland to Cuba
Ambassadors of Poland to Italy
Polish generals
Polish Military Organisation members
Polish legionnaires (World War I)
Polish people of the Polish–Soviet War
People of the Polish May Coup (pro-Piłsudski side)
Polish Freemasons
Knights of the Virtuti Militari
Recipients of the Virtuti Militari
Commanders with Star of the Order of Polonia Restituta
Commanders of the Order of Polonia Restituta
Recipients of the Cross of Independence with Swords
Recipients of the Cross of Valour (Poland)
Recipients of the Gold Cross of Merit (Poland)
Recipients of the Military Order of Max Joseph
Commandeurs of the Légion d'honneur
Recipients of the Croix de Guerre 1914–1918 (France)
Knights Grand Cross of the Order of Saints Maurice and Lazarus
Commanders of the Order of the Star of Romania
Grand Crosses of the Order of Merit of the Republic of Hungary (military)
Knights of the Holy Sepulchre
Polish politicians who committed suicide
Suicides by jumping in New York City
Burials at Rakowicki Cemetery
Polish military attachés
Recipients of the Order of the White Eagle (Poland)